Gymnocarena mississippiensis is a species of fruit fly in the genus Gymnocarena of the family Tephritidae, that lives in the United States.

References

Tephritinae
Insects described in 1992
Diptera of North America